Pansanttom Venkatesh (1926 – 1 June 1977) was an Indian footballer. Venkatesh played for East Bengal and the India national football team during his professional career.

Club career
Venkatesh spent most of his club career in East Bengal, and captained the team in 1952–53. He was part of the team that played against German side Kickers Offenbach and FC Torpedo Moscow in 1953. He also scored two goals against Torpedo in their 3–3 draw at the Central Dynamo Stadium. With East Bengal from 1948 to 1953, he scored overall 81 goals, and emerged as top scorer in 1953.

In the same year, he represented the club at the World Youth Festival in  Romania. He scored a goal against Lebanon XI in their 6–1 win.

International career
Venkatesh was part of the prominent national team during the "golden era" of Indian football, managed by Syed Abdul Rahim, became one of the best teams in Asia. He represented India and won gold-medal at the 1951 Asian Games, held in New Delhi. He also went on the play at the 1952 Summer Olympics with India.

He was also a part of Balaidas Chatterjee managed Indian team that participated in 1953 Quadrangular tournament in Rangoon, and won the title. He also won the 1954 edition.

Honours
East Bengal
 IFA Shield: 1949, 1950, 1951
Bengal
 Santosh Trophy: 1950-51

India
Asian Games Gold medal: 1951
 Colombo Cup: 1952, 1953, 1954

See also

 List of East Bengal Club captains

References

Bibliography

 

Chattopadhyay, Hariprasad (2017). Mohun Bagan–East Bengal . Kolkata: Parul Prakashan.

External links
 

1926 births
1977 deaths
Footballers from Bangalore
Association football forwards
Indian footballers
India international footballers
East Bengal Club players
Olympic footballers of India
Footballers at the 1952 Summer Olympics
Asian Games medalists in football
Footballers at the 1951 Asian Games
Place of birth missing
Medalists at the 1951 Asian Games
Asian Games gold medalists for India
Calcutta Football League players